Patricio André Vidal López (born 7 March 1990) is a Chilean former footballer.

Career

He played for Santiago Morning.

His last club was Deportes Ovalle.

References

1990 births
Living people
Footballers from Santiago
Chilean footballers
Chilean Primera División players
Santiago Morning footballers
Segunda División Profesional de Chile players
Deportes Ovalle footballers
Association football midfielders